Brook Barrington is a New Zealand public servant and former diplomat. He was appointed chief executive of the Department of the Prime Minister and Cabinet (DPMC) in February 2019 and was previously chief executive of the Ministry of Foreign Affairs and Trade (MFAT). 

Barrington began his public service career at MFAT in 1990. He had diplomatic postings in Canberra and Brussels and was the Ambassador of New Zealand to Thailand for three years. After leaving MFAT, Barrington held deputy chief executive positions at the Ministry of Defence and Ministry of Justice. He returned to MFAT as chief executive in 2015 and was credited with "restoring order" to the department after a "controversial" restructuring process.

State Services Commissioner Peter Hughes reassigned Barrington to head DPMC in 2019 as part of a series of high-profile transfers between departments.

Barrington holds a PhD in history from the University of Auckland; his advisor was Nicholas Tarling.

References

1965 births
Living people
Ambassadors of New Zealand to Thailand
Ambassadors of New Zealand to Cambodia
New Zealand public servants